Emily Caroline Townshend (1849 – 1934) was a British social reformer.

Born Emily Gibson, she was the first applicant to, and one of the first five students at Girton College, Cambridge, then in Hitchin.  She studied there from 1869 to 1872, and while there met her husband, Cambrey Corker Townshend, through a fellow student, Isabella Townshend.

Townshend joined the Fabian Society in 1894, becoming active in its Research Department and writing several tracts for the group.  She also served a term on its executive in 1915/16.  She spent two years as editor of the School Child journal, and was also active on the Walham Green Juvenile Advisory Committee.

In 1907, age 57, Townshend spent two weeks in Holloway Prison for her part in a suffragette protest. In 1909, her daughter Rachel Townsend spent two months imprisoned there for similar activities.

Her daughter Caroline Townsend (1878–1944) was a leading stained glass artist and followed her mother in membership of the Fabian Society and interest in women's suffrage.

References

1849 births
1934 deaths
Alumni of Girton College, Cambridge
Members of the Fabian Society
English suffragettes
Prisoners and detainees of England and Wales
English feminists
British women's rights activists